Old Upper Springfield Friends Burying Ground is a cemetery located in Springfield Township and Wrightstown, in Burlington County, New Jersey.

The cemetery and the accompanying meeting house were placed on both the New Jersey (state ID # 875) and the National Register of Historic Places (Reference # 79001479) in 1979.

Notable burials
 Thomas Newbold (1760-1823), represented New Jersey in the United States House of Representatives from 1807 to 1813.
 George Sykes (1806-1880), represented New Jersey's 2nd congressional district in the United States House of Representatives from 1843 to 1845, and was reelected in 1845 to fill a vacancy, serving until 1847.

See also
National Register of Historic Places listings in Burlington County, New Jersey

References

External links

 Old Upper Springfield Friends Burying Ground / Upper Springfield Cemetery at The Political Graveyard
 Old Upper Springfield Friends Burying Ground at Find A Grave

Historic districts on the National Register of Historic Places in New Jersey
Cemeteries in Burlington County, New Jersey
Cemeteries on the National Register of Historic Places in New Jersey
National Register of Historic Places in Burlington County, New Jersey
Springfield Township, Burlington County, New Jersey
Wrightstown, New Jersey
1727 establishments in New Jersey
Pre-statehood history of New Jersey